Hafsa Zinaï Koudil (born 1951) is an Algerian novelist, journalist and film director living in France.

Life
Hafsa Zinaï Koudil was born on 13 September 1951 in Aïn Beïda in the East of Algeria. 

She worked for Radiodiffusion Télévision Algérienne until dispute over her first 16mm feature film. Le démon au féminin treated the true story of Latifa, a confident professional Algerian who refused to wear a headscarf. At the request of her husband, Latifa was violently exorcised by Islamic fundamentalists in 1991: her torture lasted for six hours, leaving her with injuries which confined her to a wheelchair. While shooting the film between September 1992 and January 1993, Hafsa Zinaï Koudil received death threats. After an attempted kidnapping, she fled into exile in Tunisia and was followed by her family. She needed a police escort at the Amiens International Film Festival, where her film shared the Prix du Public.

Works

Novels
 La fin d'un rêve [The end of a dream], 1984
 Le pari perdu [The lost bet], 1986
 Papillon ne volera plus [The butterfly will no longer fly], 1990
 Le passé décomposé [The imperfect past], 1992.
 Sans voix [Voiceless], 1997

Films
 Le démon au féminin / al-Shaytan imra`a [Woman as the devil], 1993/1994.

References

Further reading
 Anna Marie Miraglia, 'Maghrebian Women: Violence, Silence and Speaking Out', in Lorna Milne. ed., Postcolonial Violence, Culture and Identity in Francophone West Africa, the Maghreb and the Antilles, Berne: Peter Lang, 2007, pp.123-142

External links
 

1951 births
Living people
Algerian filmmakers
Algerian novelists
Algerian women novelists
People from Oum El Bouaghi Province
Algerian torture victims
Algerian emigrants to France
Violence against women in Algeria